The 1990 Arena Football League season was the fourth season of the Arena Football League (AFL). The league champions were the Detroit Drive, who defeated the Dallas Texans in ArenaBowl IV.

Standings

y – clinched regular-season title

x – clinched playoff spot

Playoffs

Awards and honors

Regular season awards

All-Arena team

Team notes

References